Michel Bergeron may refer to:

 Michel Bergeron (ice hockey, born 1946), retired Canadian ice hockey coach
 Michel Bergeron (ice hockey, born 1954), retired Canadian ice hockey player
Michel Bergeron (scientist), awardee of 2001 Prix Georges-Émile-Lapalme

See also
Michel Berger (1947–1992), French singer and songwriter
Michel Berger (field hockey) (born 1941), Belgian field hockey player